Lisa Grushcow is a Canadian rabbi. She was a Rhodes scholar in the 1990s. In 2012, she became senior rabbi at Temple Emanu-El-Beth Sholom in Montreal. She was born in Ottawa, Ontario, and raised in Toronto, and studied at McGill before earning a doctorate at Oxford. In 2014 she edited the Central Conference of American Rabbiss The Sacred Encounter: Jewish Perspectives on Sexuality, meant to communicate Judaism and sexuality to lay readers.

Bibliography

References

Sources

Further reading

Canadian Rhodes Scholars
Canadian Reform rabbis
Living people
McGill University alumni
Alumni of the University of Oxford
People from Ottawa
Year of birth missing (living people)
Reform women rabbis